Rotsund Chapel is a parish church of the Church of Norway in Nordreisa Municipality in Troms og Finnmark county, Norway. It is located in the village of Rotsund. It is one of the two churches for the Nordreisa parish which is part of the Nord-Troms prosti (deanery) in the Diocese of Nord-Hålogaland. The red, wooden church was built in a long church style in 1932. The church seats about 240 people.

History
A cemetery was built in Rotsund in 1860 so that people didn't have to travel so far to bury their dead. Almost immediately, there was a desire by the local population to build a church alongside the new cemetery. In 1887, the municipal council in Skjervøy, of which Rotsund was then a part, decided to build a church there. They petitioned the authorities to do so, but it was not until 1920 when a royal resolution authorized the construction of a chapel in Rotsund. Fundraising began for the chapel through collections and gifts as well as a  grant from the government. Construction began in February 1932, and took only five months. The new building was consecrated on 18 September 1932 by the Bishop Eivind Berggrav. During World War II, the chapel was requisitioned by German forces and used as a barracks. During that time the altarpiece was destroyed, but the rest of the building only had minor damages. After the war in 1946, a new altarpiece was installed. In 1999, the interior of the chapel was completely renovated.

Media gallery

See also
List of churches in Nord-Hålogaland

References

Churches in Troms
Nordreisa
Wooden churches in Norway
20th-century Church of Norway church buildings
Churches completed in 1932
1932 establishments in Norway
Long churches in Norway